A foe is an enemy.

Foe or FOE may also refer to:

People 
 Greg Foe (born 1991), Samoan rugby player
 Marc-Vivien Foé (1975–2003), Cameroonian football midfielder
 Victoria Foe (born 1945), American developmental biologist

Entertainment
 Foe (Coetzee novel), a 1986 novel by J. M. Coetzee
 Foe (Reid novel), a 2018 novel by Iain Reid
 Foe (EP), a 2003 EP by the German band Blackmail
 Forge of Empires, a 2012 mobile game
 "Foe" (Person of Interest), an episode of the American television drama series Person of Interest

Companies and organizations
 Friends of the Earth, a network of environmental organizations
 Fred. Olsen Energy, a Norwegian offshore driller
 Fraternal Order of Eagles, international fraternal order

Other uses 
 Topeka Regional Airport (IATA airport code: FOE) in Kansas, United States
 Foe (unit), a unit of energy used in astrophysics
 Foe language, spoken in Papua New Guinea
 Prix Marc-Vivien Foé (Foé Prize) for the best African nationals player in Ligue 1

See also
 U-Foes, Marvel Comics supervillain team
 PHO (disambiguation)
 Defoe (disambiguation)
 Friend or Foe (disambiguation)